Dan Baugh (born September 10, 1974 in Regina, Saskatchewan) is a Canadian rugby union player, who retired in 2005 due to a long string of injuries. He ended his career in Wales with the Cardiff Blues of the Celtic League.

A popular player at the Cardiff Arms Park, he joined the club in 1998 after back row forward Gwyn Jones broke his neck. The Canadian international, renowned for his direct running and bruising tackles, enjoyed a successful period at the club. His approach has however not come without his share of injuries to his knees in particular, but it was a break to his foot which caused him to retire.

After retirement, he remained with Cardiff Blues as a conditioning coach. During the 2007–8 season he became forwards coach. In 2011 he left Cardiff Blues to take up a permanent role with Wales. In 2014 it was announced he would join Wasps RFC as the strength and conditioning coach.

He played 27 times for the Canadian national team.

Notes

1974 births
Living people
Canadian rugby union players
Canada international rugby union players
Rugby union flankers
Sportspeople from Regina, Saskatchewan
Cardiff Rugby players
Canadian people of Danish descent
Rugby union strength and conditioning coaches